Benz Hui Shiu-hung (born 4 November 1948) is a Hong Kong film and TV actor. Hui is credited with over 165 films. Hui is a currently a TV actor with TVB.

Early life and family
Hui comes from an influential family in Canton. His great-grandfather was a godson of Empress Dowager Cixi and served as an imperial official during the late Qing dynasty. Hui's great-aunt, Xu Guangping (Cantonese: Hui Kwong-ping), was married to the writer Lu Xun. His granduncle Xu Chongzhi (Cantonese: Hui Chung-chi) was a founder of the Whampoa Military Academy, while his other granduncle Xu Chongqing (Cantonese: Hui Chung-ching) once served as an education minister of Canton. His name "Benz" was inspired by "Mercedes-Benz", as he was the first ATV actor to drive a Mercedes-Benz to work.

Career
In 1972, Hui started his acting career. Hui first appeared in Young People, a 1972 film directed by Chang Cheh. Hui started his acting career in supporting roles of various television series. He also joined the presentation of films in 1974. Hui has starred in many notable roles, including the part of Inspector Wong in Running Out of Time in 1999. Hui earned the nomination of best supporting actor in the 19th Annual Hong Kong Film Awards. Hui is credited with over 165 films.

Personal life 
Hui's wife is Angeli Hui (aka Yin-yi Lung), a Singaporean. They have a daughter, Charmaine Hui. Hui and his family live in Hong Kong and also in Yishun, Singapore. Hui is a permanent resident of Singapore.

To help his daughter who struggled with math, Hui and his wife opened a Singaporean tutoring school in Hong Kong.

Filmography

Films

TV series

References

External links

Hui Siu-Hung at hkmdb.com
Hui Siu-Hung at lovehkfilm.com
 Benz Hui at jaynestars.com

Hong Kong male television actors
Hong Kong male film actors
TVB veteran actors
1948 births
Living people
20th-century Hong Kong male actors
21st-century Hong Kong male actors